In cartography and geographic information systems, rubbersheeting is a form of coordinate transformation that warps a  vector dataset to match a known geographic space. This is most commonly needed when a dataset has systematic positional error, such as one  digitized from a historical map of low accuracy. The mathematics and procedure are very similar to the georeferencing of  raster images, and this term is occasionally used for that process as well, but image georegistration is an unambiguous term for the raster process.

Applications in history and historical geography
Rubbersheeting is a useful technique in HGIS, where it is used to digitize and add old maps as feature layers in a modern GIS. Before aerial photography arrived, most maps were highly inaccurate by modern standards. Rubbersheeting may improve the value of such sources and make them easier to compare to modern maps.

Software
 ESRI's ArcGIS 8.3+ has the capability of rubbersheeting vector data, and ArcMap 9.2+ may also rubber-sheet raster layers. 
 Autodesk's AutoCAD Map 3D and AutoCAD Civil 3D (which includes most of AutoCAD Map 3D's functionality) allows a user to rubbersheet vector data, and Autodesk's Raster Design (an add-in product for AutoCAD-based products) allows a user to rubbersheet raster data.
 Blue Marble Geographics' Global Mapper allows a user to rubbersheet raster data.
 Cadcorp Spatial Information System software (SIS Map Modeller) is offering a tool for rubbersheeting data layers.
 QGIS Georeferencer plug-in provides a number of transformation types including Thin Plate Spline, which enables full rubber-sheeting. QGIS is a free open-source GIS package.

See also 
 Image rectification
 Image registration

References

Further reading 
 
 
 

Cartography
Historical geographic information systems